Cosipara tricoloralis, the tricolored cosipara moth, is a moth in the family Crambidae. It was described by Harrison Gray Dyar Jr. in 1904. It is found in North America, where it has been recorded from British Columbia, California, Colorado, Montana, Oregon and Washington.

Adults have been recorded on wing from May to September.

References

Moths described in 1904
Scopariinae